Government College, Bijawar is one of the pioneer institution of higher education in rural and tribal areas of Madhya Pradesh. It has the rare distinction of having completed Seventeen years of its inception in 1987-88. This College has been serving the cause of education right from the times of the erstwhile princely state of Bijawar.

Location
It is situated about 37 km. in south from district headquarters Chhatarpur (M.P.) and nearest to tourist and religious place Jatashankar and Bhimkund.

History
It was established in 1987 as under graduate level higher education institute. It was started P. G. classes in Subject Pol. Science, Hindi Literature and Economics by the contribution of Janbhagidhari Samiti. This College is one of the Bundelkhand's regions education institute which educate large number of tribal and poorest students in its surrounding area.

References 

Educational institutions established in 1987
Universities and colleges in Madhya Pradesh
1987 establishments in Madhya Pradesh